The 2010–11 Drake Bulldogs men's basketball team represented Drake University during the 2010-11 NCAA Division I men's basketball season. The team, which plays in the Missouri Valley Conference (MVC), was led by third-year head coach Mark Phelps and played their home games at the Knapp Center. The Bulldogs finished the season 13–18, 7–11 in Missouri Valley play and lost in the first round of the 2011 Missouri Valley Conference men's basketball tournament.

Preseason
Sean Duff and Sean Jones are no longer on the team. Craig Stanley, Josh Young, Bill Eaddy, and Adam Templeton all graduated.

Regular season

Roster

Schedule

|-
!colspan=9| Exhibition

|-
!colspan=9| Regular season

|-
!colspan=9| Missouri Valley Conference tournament

References

Drake
Drake Bulldogs men's basketball seasons
Drake
Drake